The Irish World is a weekly newspaper for Irish people in Britain and their families. It was established in 1987 by Paddy Cowan, and is edited by Bernard Purcell. Its office is located at 934 North Circular Road, in London.

It is a full colour tabloid, usually between 40 and 56 pages, published 51 weeks a year each Wednesday. It has a readership in the region of 42,000 and is distributed across the UK, Ireland and mainland Europe through all major outlets and independent stores.
 
It puts particular emphasis on all sports including GAA Hurling and Football, rugby, soccer and boxing. It has an extensive  music and entertainment section – most notably covering Country Music, traditional Irish music and modern music across many genres.  Irish dancing, theatre and film are well covered and represented, as is local and general business and news from Ireland, UK and around the world. It is independent and not aligned to any political party in the UK or Ireland.

The Irish World is the main media outlet for London GAA.

It is a national and international newspaper with a readership represented all over the UK, Ireland and Europe. 

It hosted the unique Irish World Awards until the closure of The Galtymore dance hall in Cricklewood in 2008. Those awards were revived at the Novotel Hotel in Hammersmith, for special 25th and 30th anniversary events in 2012 and 2017.

Editors have included Damien Gaffney, Donal Mooney, Frank Murphy and the present editor Bernard Purcell.

See also
 Irish migration to Great Britain

References

External links

Newspapers published in London
Newspapers established in 1987
1987 establishments in England